The "Kharkiv" Police Battalion was formed in autumn 2015 from the special police unit battalion's "Kharkiv-1", "Kharkiv-2" and "Slobozhanshchyna". They have been involved in maintaining public order and guarding strategically important facilities in Mariupol.

See also
 List of special law enforcement units

References

History of Kharkiv Oblast
Special tasks patrol police of Ukraine
Military units and formations established in 2015
2015 establishments in Ukraine